Lomonosovsky Prospekt is a station on the Kalininsko-Solntsevskaya Line of the Moscow Metro. It opened on 16 March 2017 as part of the line's extension between Park Pobedy and Ramenki. Tunneling between the station and that next from it, Ramenki, started in 2013.

References

Moscow Metro stations
Kalininsko-Solntsevskaya line
Railway stations in Russia opened in 2017
Railway stations located underground in Russia